Bigelow is a ghost town in Marshall County, Kansas, United States.  It was located six and a half miles southwest of Frankfort.

History
It was founded in 1881 and named for General Alfred Bigelow.  It was known for its limestone quarries and peaked in population in 1910 at 200.  

The post office closed in 1960 and the town was demolished during the construction of Tuttle Creek Lake.  All that remains is a historical marker at the intersection of 17th and Zenith Roads and Antioch Cemetery.

References

Further reading

External links
 Marshall County maps: Current, Historic, KDOT

Former populated places in Marshall County, Kansas
Former populated places in Kansas